Faceless is a 1988 French slasher film directed by Jesús Franco. The film is about Dr. Flamand (Helmut Berger) and his assistant Nathalie (Brigitte Lahaie) who lure unsuspecting victims to use their skin to perform plastic surgery on the doctor's disfigured sister - a plot reminiscent of Franco's earlier film, Gritos en la noche (1961). Hallen (Telly Savalas) is a New York businessman who hires private detective Sam Morgan (Chris Mitchum) to find his missing fashion model daughter Barbara (Caroline Munro). Other elements of the story include a Nazi doctor (Anton Diffring) and a chainsaw/power tool tormentor who are called in by Dr. Flamand.

Plot
A former patient of Dr. Frank Flamand, a disfigured Mrs. Francoisis, seeks revenge for a botched operation by throwing acid at him, but she misses and catches his sister, Ingrid, full in the face, resulting in severe burns.

At a photoshoot in Paris, the doctor's assistant Nathalie drugs and kidnaps Barbara Hallen and locks her in a room in the basement of Flamand's clinic. Whilst checking on other kidnapped girls, a scuffle starts with Natalie and Gordon, who lives in the basement chops off the girl's arms.

In New York City, Barbara's father, Terry Hallen, is desperately awaiting news of his daughter and hires a private detective, Sam Morgan, to go and find her. Once in Paris, Morgan visits a morgue with Brian Wallace of the Paris police to see a decapitated body, but knows it is not Barbara due to a missing mole.

Flamand and Nathalie go to see a surgeon, Dr. Orloff, about an operation to amputate Barbara's face and attach it to his sister Ingrid's face. Orloff tells them to track down Nazi doctor Karl Heinz Moser. They return to find Barbara's face has been badly cut by Gordon.

Morgan interviews Barbara's photo director Maxence and gets some information through intimidation before Maxence's bouncer, Doudo, forces Morgan to flee. Meanwhile, Flamand has kidnapped another woman, the call-girl Melissa, to use for the face transplant. Morgan updates Terry with limited information on Barbara - that she was a prostitute and that she left with a gold watch.

Moser arrives for the operation, performed while Melissa is living, but destroys Melissa's donor face due to complications. Gordon severs Melissa's head from her body using a chainsaw, killing her. Flamand and Nathalie seek a replacement. At a club, they find an actress, trick her into going to the clinic, drug her and hide her body. Morgan traces a credit card belonging to Barbara Hallen to the Paris suburb of Saint-Cloud, and to Flamand's clinic.

At the clinic, Morgan sees a watch Natalie is wearing and later sees this in pictures at his hotel as belonging to Barbara and decides to return to the clinic. A nurse at the clinic enters the basement and finds all of the girls locked up. She is caught and killed by Gordon. At this moment, Moser, Flamand, and Nathalie remove the actress's face and show it to Ingrid.

Morgan returns to the clinic and is attacked by Gordon but manages to impale him on some hooks. Morgan finds keys and locates the girls and Barbara but is locked in Barbara's cell with her by Natalie. Flamand, Moser and Nathalie then brick up the cell. Barbara and Sam find themselves trapped and gasping for air.

Sam, however, has sent Terry a message, saying that he has traced Barbara to a clinic in Paris and that he's going to it to look for her, and that if he doesn't leave a message in 12 hours, "send in the marines, Merry Christmas." Terry says to his office executive to get him on the first flight to Paris in hopes of rescuing the two.

Alternate ending
The original ending of the film involved Sam successfully rescuing Barbara, and arresting Flamand, Nathalie, Moser, and Ingrid, with Terry going to Paris to pick them up. Jess Franco wanted a slightly different touch to make it different, so while switching the ending around, this time it is mentioned that Terry Hallen is going to Paris to the clinic, but it is left open, if he gets there in time to save them or not.

Cast
 Helmut Berger as Dr. Frank Flamand
 Brigitte Lahaie as Nathalie
 Chris Mitchum as Sam Morgan
 Telly Savalas as Terry Hallen
 Caroline Munro as Barbara Hallen
 Anton Diffring as Dr. Karl Heinz Moser
 Howard Vernon as Dr. Orloff
 Stéphane Audran as Mrs. Sherman
 Tilda Thamar as Mme François

Release
The film was released in different languages, including French. It was released on UHD and blu-ray by Severin Films in 2022.

Reception
From contemporary reviews, the film was reviewed by a critic credited as "Len." in Variety who reviewed the film on June 26, 1988. "Len." referred to the film as a "routine gore-and-softcore shocker" noting that the "Special gore effects are part for the course. The director, Jesus Franco, a specialist of porn and horror films, seems to have directed with his eyes closed."

References

Sources

External links
 
 
 

1988 films
1988 horror films
English-language French films
English-language Spanish films
Films about kidnapping
Films about surgeons
Films directed by Jesús Franco
Films set in New York City
Films set in Paris
French detective films
French slasher films
1980s slasher films
Spanish detective films
Spanish slasher films
Works about plastic surgery
1980s French films